is a Japanese football player who currently plays for Zweigen Kanazawa.

Career
Junya Kato joined J3 League club Gainare Tottori in 2017.

Club statistics
Updated to 22 March 2018.

References

External links

Profile at Gainare Tottori

1994 births
Living people
Josai International University alumni
Association football people from Hiroshima Prefecture
Japanese footballers
J2 League players
J3 League players
Gainare Tottori players
Thespakusatsu Gunma players
Association football forwards